Lily Was Here (original title in Dutch: De Kassière, The Cashier) is a 1989 Dutch drama film directed by Ben Verbong. One song from the film's soundtrack, performed by Candy Dulfer and Dave Stewart, was later released as a single – "Lily Was Here".

Plot
Teenager Lily works as a checkout girl at the local supermarket. She becomes pregnant, but before the child is born, the black father is attacked by a gang of thugs and killed. Following his death, she flees to the city, where she soon finds herself under the wings of a pimp, Ted. Escaping Ted, she commences a one-woman spree of thefts, culminating in running from the police and the press. In the end, Lily is forced to choose between freedom and her baby.

Cast
 Marion van Thijn ...Lily
 Thom Hoffman ... Arend
 Coen van Vrijberghe de Coningh ... Ted
 Truus te Selle ... Lily's Mother
 Con Meyer ...Sjaak
 Monique van de Ven ...Midwife Conny
 Hans Kesting ... Piccolo
 Kees Hulst ... Emile
  ... Helen

Background

 The film was largely shot in Rotterdam.
 Marion van Thijn is the daughter of former mayor Ed van Thijn of Amsterdam.
 The music for the film was composed by David A. Stewart, former member of the band Eurythmics. A soundtrack album of the same name was also released.
 The title song, "Lily Was Here," reached first place in the Dutch charts and was a hit internationally. Candy Dulfer played the major saxophone pieces on the track.

External links 
 

1989 films
1980s Dutch-language films
Films directed by Ben Verbong
1989 drama films
Dutch drama films